Husein Alireza (born 27 August 1993) is a Saudi rower. He competed in the 2020 Summer Olympics.

References

External links
 
 
 

1993 births
Living people
Rowers at the 2020 Summer Olympics
Saudi Arabian male rowers
Olympic rowers of Saudi Arabia
Rowers at the 2018 Asian Games
Asian Games competitors for Saudi Arabia
20th-century Saudi Arabian people
21st-century Saudi Arabian people